is a former Japanese football player who last played for Tegevajaro Miyazaki.

Club statistics
Updated to 20 February 2020.

References

External links
Profile at Azul Claro Numazu

j-league

1987 births
Living people
Rissho University alumni
Association football people from Nagano Prefecture
Japanese footballers
J2 League players
Japan Football League players
Fagiano Okayama players
Matsumoto Yamaga FC players
Azul Claro Numazu players
Tegevajaro Miyazaki players
Association football midfielders
People from Matsumoto, Nagano